McCulloch Motors Corporation is an American manufacturer of chainsaws and other outdoor power tools. The company was founded in Milwaukee, Wisconsin, in 1943 by Robert Paxton McCulloch as a manufacturer of small two-stroke gasoline engines and introduced its first chainsaw in 1948, the Model 5-49. McCulloch and its brand are owned by Husqvarna.

History 

McCulloch moved its operation to California in 1946. In the 1950s, McCulloch manufactured target drone engines, which were sold to RadioPlane in the 1970s. These McCulloch 4318 small four cylinder horizontally opposed two-stroke engines were also popular for use in various small autogyros, such as the Bensen B-8M and Wallis WA-116.

McCulloch also started Paxton Automotive, manufacturing McCulloch-labeled superchargers like the one fitted to the Kaiser Manhattan, the 1957 Studebaker Golden Hawk, and Ford Thunderbird.

In 1959, they produced their first kart engine, the McCulloch MC-10, an adapted chainsaw two-stroke engine. Bill Van Tichelt of VanTech Engineering designed and produced one of the first specialized and most successful intake manifolds for the McCulloch kart engine, along with mufflers, conversion kits, throttle linkages, air stacks and bottom slopers.

Lake Havasu City 
In 1964, McCulloch founded Lake Havasu City, Arizona, with a factory and housing for its workers. The company founder Robert McCulloch was involved in buying the London Bridge at auction in the 1960s, and reassembling it in Lake Havasu City by 1968.

Product lines 
In 1967, McCulloch discontinued its line of outboard boat engines which it began after the 1956 purchase of Scott-Atwater Manufacturing Company of Minneapolis, Minnesota - the manufacturer of Scott-Atwater outboard boat engines.

In the 1970s their range was expanded to add generators, hedge trimmers, string trimmers, and leaf blowers, but started a narrow focus on lawn and garden equipment.

Corporate changes 
By 1978, Charles Hurwitz had 13% holdings in the company. Black and Decker bought McCulloch on 4 October 1974, and sold the company to a private group in November 1984.

In January 1999, the company filed for Chapter 11 bankruptcy and sold its European division to Husqvarna AB. In October 1999, its North American operation was acquired by the Taiwanese company Jenn Feng Industrial Co. Jenn Feng added electric power tools and pressure washers to the product line.

In March 2003, MTD Products signed a distribution and licensing agreement with Jenn Feng in which MTD would exclusively produce McCulloch products in North America.

In March 2008, Husqvarna acquired the outdoor products division of Jenn Feng, gaining access to the McCulloch brand in the North American market. McCulloch is since a brand within the Husqvarna Group.

Related companies
 McCulloch Aircraft Corporation
 McCulloch Oil Corporation
 Paxton Automotive
 Scott-Atwater Manufacturing Company

References

External links
 McCulloch

Garden tool manufacturers
Power tool manufacturers
Lawn and garden tractors
Chainsaws
Agricultural machinery manufacturers of the United States
Marine engine manufacturers
Companies based in Tucson, Arizona
Tool manufacturing companies of the United States